Muyelensaurus (meaning "Muyelen lizard", after an indigenous name for the Colorado River in Argentina) is a genus of titanosaurian sauropod dinosaur from the Late Cretaceous of Argentina. It was more slender than other titanosaurs. Fossils have been recovered from the Plottier Formation in the Neuquén province of Patagonia. The type species is M. pecheni. The name Muyelensaurus first appeared in a 2007 paper by Argentine paleontologists Jorge Calvo of the Universidad Nacional del Comahue and Bernardo González Riga of the Laboratorio de Paleovertebrados, and Brazilian paleontologist Juan Porfiri of the Universidade Federal do Rio de Janeiro.

Classification
The cladogram below follows Franca et al. (2016), placing Muyelensaurus as a basal lithostrotian.

The cladogram below follows Mocho et al. (2019), this time placing Muyelensaurus within Rinconsauria.

References

Bibliography 
 Calvo, J.O.; González-Riga, B.J.; and Porfiri, J.D. (2007) "A new titanosaur sauropod from the Late Cretaceous of Neuquén, Patagonia, Argentina." Arquivos do Museu Nacional, Rio de Janeiro 65(4):485-504 PDF

External links 

 South American sauropods

Lithostrotians
Coniacian life
Santonian life
Late Cretaceous dinosaurs of South America
Cretaceous Argentina
Fossils of Argentina
Portezuelo Formation
Fossil taxa described in 2007
Taxa named by Jorge O. Calvo